Akbar Muhammad (1939 – April 12, 2016) was an associate Professor Emeritus of history and Africana studies at Binghamton University in New York. He specialized in African history, West African social history, as well as the study of Islam in Africa and the Americas. He is the co-editor of Racism, Sexism, and the World-System, along with Joan Smith, Jane Collins, and Terrence K. Hopkins. His own writings focused on slavery in Muslim Africa, Muslims in the United States, and integration in Nigeria through the use of education. He holds a notable role in the history of the Nation of Islam.

Early life
Akbar Muhammad (the National Assistant to Louis Farrakhan) was not related (in any way), nor was he the youngest child of Elijah Muhammad and Clara Muhammad.  The “Akbar Muhammad” to which is referred here, is a different person who actually is the youngest son of Elijah Muhammad was also the brother of Imam Warith Deen Mohammed. He received his Doctor of Philosophy from Edinburgh University in Scotland. While completing his degree from Edinburgh, Muhammad was appointed as a founding director of Afro-American Studies at Vanderbilt University. He served on the board of trustees for the American Islamic College in Chicago. Through his years in Cairo, he became fluent in Arabic.

References

Elijah Muhammad family
Alumni of the University of Edinburgh
Al-Azhar University alumni